Breidenhart is a historic castle-like house built in 1894 by Samuel Leeds Allen and located at 255 East Main Street in Moorestown, New Jersey. It was added to the National Register of Historic Places on December 22, 1977, for its significance in art, architecture, commerce, and music. It was added as a contributing property to the Moorestown Historic District in 1990. The building is now owned by the Lutheran Social Ministries of New Jersey.

History
In 1894, Samuel Leeds Allen, inventor of the Flexible Flyer sled, commissioned architect Walter Smedley to design his new residence. Allen named it Breidenhart, meaning "broad hearth stone". In 1918, after Allen's death, the house was sold to Eldridge R. Johnson, founder and president of the Victor Talking Machine Company. In 1947, after Johnson's death, it was sold to the Lutheran Home of New Jersey.

Description
The house is a two and one-half story stone building featuring Queen Anne architecture and a polygonal corner turret. It is located on a  landscaped lot.

See also
 National Register of Historic Places listings in Burlington County, New Jersey

References

External links

 

Moorestown, New Jersey
National Register of Historic Places in Burlington County, New Jersey
Houses on the National Register of Historic Places in New Jersey
Historic district contributing properties in New Jersey
Individually listed contributing properties to historic districts on the National Register in New Jersey
New Jersey Register of Historic Places
Houses in Burlington County, New Jersey
Queen Anne architecture in New Jersey
Stone houses in New Jersey
Houses completed in 1894